Alfredo Arango may refer to:
 Alfredo Arango (footballer) (1945–2005), Colombian footballer
 Alfredo Arango (baseball), Cuban baseball player